Corey Williams may refer to:

 Corey Williams (American football) (born 1980), American football defensive tackle for the Detroit Lions
 Corey Williams (basketball, born 1970), American basketball coach and former NBA player
 Corey Williams (basketball, born 1977), American former basketball player
 Corey Williams (producer) (born 1978), American film producer
 Latif (singer) (Corey Williams, born 1981), American R&B singer and songwriter

See also
 Cory T. Williams, American attorney and Democratic politician
 Cory Williams (born 1981), YouTube personality also known as "Mr. Safety"
Korey Williams, American football wide receiver